The 1995 Kansas City Royals season was a season in American baseball. During this season, the Royals finished second in the American League Central, with a record of 70 wins and 74 losses. This was the first of 17 losing seasons the Royals would suffer through 2012. 

Although the 1995 Royals had a losing record and finished 30 games behind the Cleveland Indians, the second-place division finish in 1995 was the highest finish for the franchise in the American League Central from 1994, when the Royals joined that division, until the 2014 team also finished second and the 2015 team won the franchise's first Central Division championship.

Regular season

Season standings

Record vs. opponents

Notable transactions
 April 5, 1995: Brian McRae was traded by the Kansas City Royals to the Chicago Cubs for Derek Wallace and Geno Morones (minors).
 April 6, 1995: David Cone was traded by the Kansas City Royals to the Toronto Blue Jays for Chris Stynes, David Sinnes (minors), and Tony Medrano (minors).
April 19, 1995: Félix José was signed as a free agent with the Kansas City Royals.
April 25, 1995: Doug Linton was signed as a free agent with the Kansas City Royals.
April 26, 1995: Vince Coleman signed as a free agent with the Kansas City Royals.
May 14, 1995: Félix José was released by the Kansas City Royals.
June 29, 1995: Kevin Elster was signed as a free agent with the Kansas City Royals.
July 3, 1995: Kevin Elster was released by the Kansas City Royals.
August 15, 1995: Vince Coleman was traded by the Kansas City Royals to the Seattle Mariners for a player to be named later. The Seattle Mariners sent Jim Converse (August 18, 1995) to the Kansas City Royals to complete the trade.
September 8, 1995: Juan Samuel was traded by the Detroit Tigers to the Kansas City Royals for a player to be named later. The Kansas City Royals sent Phil Hiatt (September 14, 1995) to the Detroit Tigers to complete the trade.

Roster

Player stats

Batting

Starters by position 
Note: Pos = Position; G = Games played; AB = At bats; H = Hits; Avg. = Batting average; HR = Home runs; RBI = Runs batted in

Other batters 
Note: G = Games played; AB = At bats; H = Hits; Avg. = Batting average; HR = Home runs; RBI = Runs batted in

Pitching

Starting pitchers 
Note: G = Games pitched; IP = Innings pitched; W = Wins; L = Losses; ERA = Earned run average; SO = Strikeouts

Other pitchers 
Note: G = Games pitched; IP = Innings pitched; W = Wins; L = Losses; ERA = Earned run average; SO = Strikeouts

Relief pitchers 
Note: G = Games pitched; W = Wins; L = Losses; SV = Saves; ERA = Earned run average; SO = Strikeouts

Farm system 

LEAGUE CHAMPIONS: GCL Royals

References

1995 Kansas City Royals at Baseball Reference
1995 Kansas City Royals at Baseball Almanac

Kansas City Royals seasons
Kansas City Royals season
Kansas